GJL may refer to:
 Gender Justice League
 Genoa Joint Laboratories
 Jijel Ferhat Abbas Airport, in Algeria